Baruipur is a town and a municipality of the South 24 Parganas district in the Indian state of West Bengal. It is a part of the area covered by the Kolkata Metropolitan Development Authority (KMDA). It is the headquarters of the Baruipur subdivision.

History
Many janapadas grew up along the old Bhagirathi channel from the ancient times till around the 16th century: Kalighat, Boral, Rajpur, Harinavi, Mahinagar, Baruipur, Baharu, Jaynagar, Majilpur, Chhatrabhog etc. Bipradas Pipilai's Manasavijaya, composed in 1495, mentions many places in this region. "Chand Sadagar, a merchant character of the Manasavijaya, reached Baruipur, from Kalighat, through the old Bhagirathi channel. From there he proceeded towards Chhatrabhog, and then traveling through Hatiagarh pargana reached the open sea". Chaitanyadeva (1486–1534) also went through this route. Travelling by boat to Puri he halted at the village of Atisara, near Baruipur. "His last stoppage in 24 Parganas was at Chhatrabhog, now a village within the jurisdiction of the Mathurapur police station. Chhatrabhog seems to have been an important river-port on the old Bhagirathi channel". Rama Chandra Khan, the zamindar of Chhatrabhog, helped Chaitanyadeva to continue with his journey.

Geography

Area overview
Baruipur subdivision is a rural subdivision with moderate levels of urbanization. 31.05% of the population lives in the urban areas and 68.95% lives in the rural areas. In the southern portion of the subdivision (shown in the map alongside) there are 20 census towns. The entire district is situated in the Ganges Delta and the southern part is covered by the Baruipur-Jaynagar Plain. Archaeological excavations at Dhosa and Tilpi, on the bank of the Piyali River indicate the existence of human habitation around 2,000 years ago.

Note: The map alongside presents some of the notable locations in the subdivision. All places marked in the map are linked in the larger full screen map.

Location

Khodar Bazar on the west, Salipur on the north, Baruipur (CT) on the east are census towns adjacent to Baruipur, and Komarhat is a little away on the south, as per the map of the Baruipur CD block in the District Census Handbook 2011 for the South 24 Parganas district.

Climate
Köppen-Geiger climate classification system classifies its climate as tropical wet and dry (Aw).

Demographics

According to the 2011 Census of India, Baruipur had a total population of 53,128, of which 26,718 were males and 26,410 were females. There were 3,763 people in the age range of 0 to 6 years. The total number of literate people was 45,434, which constituted 85.5% of the population with male literacy of 87.6% and female literacy of 83.4%. The effective literacy (7+) of population over 6 years of age was 92.0%, of which male literacy rate was 94.4% and female literacy rate was 89.6%. The Scheduled Castes and Scheduled Tribes population was 13,157 and 317 respectively. Baruipur had a total of 13,226 households as of 2011.

Civic administration

Municipality
It has jurisdiction over parts of the Baruipur. It is divided into 17 wards. According to the 2022 municipal election, it is being controlled by the All India Trinamool Congress.

Police stations
It has jurisdiction over parts of the Baruipur Municipality, and the Baruipur CD block.

Baruipur women police station has jurisdiction over parts of the Baruipur Municipality, and the Baruipur CD block.

CD block HQ
The headquarters of the Baruipur CD block are located at PO Piyali Town, Phultala, Baruipur. The map of the CD block Baruipur on the page number 383 in the District Census Handbook 2011 for the South 24 Parganas district shows the headquarters of the CD block as being in Baruipur.

Transport
Baruipur is on the State Highway 1.

Baruipur Junction railway station is on the Sealdah–Namkhana line of the Kolkata Suburban Railway system.

Commuters
With the electrification of the railways, suburban traffic has grown tremendously since the 1960s. As of 2005-06, more than 1.7 million (17 lakhs) commuters use the Kolkata Suburban Railway system daily. After the partition of India, refugees from erstwhile East Pakistan and Bangladesh had a strong impact on the development of urban areas in the periphery of Kolkata. The new immigrants depended on Kolkata for their livelihood, thus increasing the number of commuters. Eastern Railway runs 1,272 EMU trains daily.

Education
 Al Ameen Memorial Minority College, established in 2004, is affiliated with the University of Calcutta. It offers honours courses in bengali, english, arabic, islamic history & culture, philosophy and history, and a general course in arts.
 Baruipur High School, established in 1858, is a highly esteemed govt. sponsored boys high school, affiliated to the WBBSE & WBCHSE, offers subject of secondary education.
 Baruipur College, established in 1981, is affiliated with the University of Calcutta. It offers honours courses in bengali, english, sanskrit, history, political science, philosophy, economics, geography, education, mathematics and accounting & finance, and general degree courses in arts, science, and commerce.
 Baruipur Government Polytechnic, established in 2013, offers diploma, undergraduate and postgraduate degree courses in Engineering and Technology and other allied fields.
 Gargi Memorial Institute of Technology, established in 2011, offers diploma, undergraduate and postgraduate degree courses in Engineering and Technology and other allied fields.
 Greater Kolkata College of Engineering and Management, established in 2008, offers diploma, undergraduate and postgraduate degree courses in Engineering and Technology and other allied fields.

Healthcare
Baruipur Subdivisional Hospital, with 250 beds, is the major government medical facility in the Baruipur subdivision.

Notable people

Bankim Chandra Chatterjee, Indian novelist, poet, essayist, who wrote the novel Durgeshnandini between 1864-69 while he was the Deputy Magistrate of Baruipur.
Subhankar Chattopadhyay, Indian director, script writer, non-fiction show creator, born in Baruipur.
Madhumita Sarcar, Indian actress, born in Baruipur.

References

External links
 

Cities and towns in South 24 Parganas district
Neighbourhoods in Kolkata
Kolkata Metropolitan Area